Lithium superoxide is an unstable inorganic salt with formula LiO2.  A radical compound, it can be produced at low temperature in matrix isolation experiments, or in certain nonpolar, non-protic solvents.  Lithium superoxide is also a transient species during the reduction of oxygen in a lithium–air galvanic cell, and serves as a main constraint on possible solvents for such a battery.  For this reason, it has been investigated thoroughly using a variety of methods, both theoretical and spectroscopic.

Structure

The LiO2 molecule is a misnomer: the bonds between lithium and oxygen are highly ionic, with almost complete electron-transfer.  The force constant between the two oxygen atoms matches the constants measured for the superoxide anion (O2−) in other contexts. The bond length for the O-O bond was determined to be 1.34 Å. Using a simple crystal structure optimization, the Li-O bond was calculated to be approximately 2.10 Å.

There have been quite a few studies regarding the clusters formed by LiO2 molecules. The most common dimer has been found to be the cage isomer. Second to it is the singlet bypyramidal structure. Studies have also been done on the chair complex and the planar ring, but these two are less favorable, though not necessarily impossible.

Production and reactions 
Lithium superoxide is extremely reactive because of the odd number of electrons present in the π* molecular orbital of the superoxide anion.  Matrix isolation techniques can produce pure samples of the compound, but they are only stable at 15-40 K.

Occurrence 
Like other superoxides, lithium superoxide is the product of a one-electron reduction of an oxygen molecule.  It thus appears whenever oxygen is mixed with single-electron redox catalysts, such as p-benzoquinone.

In batteries 
Lithium superoxide also appears at the cathode of a lithium-air galvanic cell during discharge, as in the following reaction: 
Li+ + e− + O2 → LiO2
This product typically then reacts and proceed to form lithium peroxide, Li2O2
2LiO2 → Li2O2 + O2
The mechanism for this last reaction has not been confirmed and developing a complete theory of the oxygen reduction process remains a theoretical challenge .  Indeed, recent work suggests that LiO2 can be stabilized via a suitable cathode made of graphene with iridium nanoparticles.

A significant challenge when investigating these batteries is finding an ideal solvent in which to perform these reactions; current candidates are ether- and amide-based, but these compounds readily react with the superoxide and decompose. Nevertheless, lithium-air cells remain the focus of intense research, because of their large energy density—comparable to the internal combustion engine.

In the atmosphere 
Lithium superoxide can also form for extended periods of time in low-density, high-energy environments, such as the upper atmosphere.  The mesosphere contains a persistent layer of alkali metal cations ablated from meteors.  For sodium and potassium, many of the ions bond to form particles of the corresponding superoxide.  It is currently unclear whether lithium should react analogously.

See also
 Lithium oxide
 Lithium peroxide

References

Superoxides
Lithium salts